Heinrich Schëuch (sometimes Scheüch; 21 June 1864, Sélestat – 3 September 1946, Bad Kissingen) was a German officer of the Prussian Army, Generalleutnant of the German Army and (from 1918 to 1919) Prussian Minister of War.

General der Infanterie
On 27 August 1939, Tannenbergtag, the highly decorated Knight of the Order of Pour le Mérite received the "Charakter" (honorary title) as a General der Infanterie of the Wehrmacht.

Family
His father (1820–1888) worked as a jurist in Colmar. His mother Emilie Graeff was born in 1831 in Sélestat and died in 1879 in Herrlisheim-près-Colmar.

Promotions
 17 October 1893: Leutnant
 28 July 1892: Oberleutnant
 27 January 1897: Hauptmann
 18 August 1903: Major
 20 April 1910: Oberstleutnant
 22 March 1913: Oberst
 27 January 1915 or 1916: Generalmajor
 9 October 1918: Generalleutnant
 27 August 1939: Charakter als General der Infanterie

1864 births
1946 deaths
People from Sélestat

Lieutenant generals of Prussia
Generals of Infantry (Wehrmacht)
German Army generals of World War I
Recipients of the Pour le Mérite (military class)